Ajmal Khan may refer to:
 Ajmal Khan (actor) (Mohammad Ajmal Qadri, 1910–1988), Pakistani actor
 Ajmal Khan (botanist), Pakistani botanist and vice-chancellor of University of Karachi
 Ajmal Khan (cricketer), Afghan cricketer
 Ajmal Khan (Islamia College University), Pakistani vice-chancellor
 Maulana Ajmal Khan, (1930 - 2002), Pakistani Islamic scholar